Eupithecia hohokamae is a moth in the family Geometridae first described by Frederick H. Rindge in 1963. It is found in the United States in southern Arizona and California.

The length of the forewings is 11–12 mm for males and 10–12 mm for females. The forewings are pale gray, overlain with grayish brown and blackish-brown scales. The hindwings are whitish gray. Adults are on wing in very early spring.

The larvae feed on the flowers of Arbutus pungens.

References

Moths described in 1963
hohokamae
Moths of North America